The Museum of Science and Industry (MSI) is a science museum located in Chicago, Illinois, in Jackson Park, in the Hyde Park neighborhood between Lake Michigan and The University of Chicago. It is housed in the former Palace of Fine Arts from the 1893 World's Columbian Exposition. Initially endowed by Julius Rosenwald, the Sears, Roebuck and Company president and philanthropist, it was supported by the Commercial Club of Chicago and opened in 1933 during the Century of Progress Exposition.

Among the museum's exhibits are a full-size replica coal mine,  captured during World War II, a  model railroad, the command module of Apollo 8, and the first diesel-powered streamlined stainless-steel passenger train (Pioneer Zephyr).

History

The Palace of Fine Arts (also known as the Fine Arts Building) at the 1893 World's Columbian Exposition was designed by Charles B. Atwood for D. H. Burnham & Co. During the fair, the palace displayed paintings, prints, drawing, sculpture, and metal work from around the world.

Unlike the other "White City" buildings, it was constructed with a brick substructure under its plaster facade.

After the World's Fair, the palace initially housed the Columbian Museum, largely displaying collections left from the fair, which evolved into the Field Museum of Natural History. When the Field Museum moved to a new building five miles north in the Near South Side in 1920, the palace was left vacant.

School of the Art Institute of Chicago professor Lorado Taft led a public campaign to restore the building and turn it into another art museum, one devoted to sculpture. The South Park Commissioners (now part of the Chicago Park District) won approval in a referendum to sell $5 million in bonds to pay for restoration costs, hoping to turn the building into a sculpture museum, a technical trade school, and other things. However, after a few years, the building was selected as the site for a new science museum.

At this time, the Commercial Club of Chicago was interested in establishing a science museum in Chicago. Julius Rosenwald, the Sears, Roebuck and Company president and philanthropist, energized his fellow club members by pledging to pay $3 million towards the cost of converting the Palace of Fine Arts (Rosenwald eventually contributed more than $5 million to the project). During its conversion into the MSI, the building's exterior was re-cast in limestone to retain its 1893 Beaux Arts look. The interior was replaced with a new one in Art Moderne style designed by Alfred P. Shaw.

Rosenwald established the museum organization in 1926 but declined to have his name on the building. For the first few years, the museum was often called the Rosenwald Industrial Museum. In 1928, the name of the museum was officially changed to the Museum of Science and Industry. Rosenwald's vision was to create a museum in the style of the Deutsches Museum in Munich, which he had visited in 1911 while in Germany with his family.

Sewell Avery, another businessman, had supported the museum within the Commercial Club and was selected as its first president of the board of directors. The museum conducted a nationwide search for the first director. MSI's Board of Directors selected Waldemar Kaempffert, then the science editor of The New York Times, because he shared Rosenwald's vision.

He assembled the museum's curatorial staff and directed the organization and construction of the exhibits. In order to prepare the museum, Kaempffert and his staff visited the Deutsches Museum in Munich, the Science Museum in Kensington, and the Technical Museum in Vienna, all of which served as models. Kaempffert was instrumental in developing close ties with the science departments of the University of Chicago, which supplied much of the scholarship for the exhibits. Kaempffert resigned in early 1931 amid growing disputes with the second president of the board of directors; they disagreed over the objectivity and neutrality of the exhibits and Kaempffert's management of the staff.

The new Museum of Science and Industry opened to the public in three stages between 1933 and 1940. The first opening ceremony took place during the Century of Progress Exposition. Two of the museum's presidents, a number of curators and other staff members, and exhibits came to MSI from the Century of Progress event.

For years, visitors entered the museum through its original main entrance, but that entrance became no longer large enough to handle an increasing volume of visitors. The newer main entrance is a structure detached from the main museum building, through which visitors descend into an underground area and re-ascend into the main building, similar to the Louvre Pyramid.

In 1992, due to increased attendance, the museum started planning its underground parking lot, located in three underground levels below the front lawn. Construction of the underground parking lot was finished in July 1998.

For over 55 years, admission to the MSI was free, although some exhibits such as the Coal Mine and U-505 required small fees. General entrance fees were first charged in the early 1990s, with general admission rates increasing from $13 in 2008 to $18 in 2015. Many "free days"—for Illinois residents only—are offered throughout the year.

On October 3, 2019, the museum announced that it intends to change its name to the Kenneth C. Griffin Museum of Science and Industry after a donation of $125 million from the now former Chicago billionaire Kenneth C. Griffin. It is the largest single gift in the museum's history, effectively doubling its endowment. However, president and chief executive officer David Mosena said the formal name change could take some time, due to the complexity of the process. He also said part of the gift will go into funding "a state-of-the-art digital gallery and performance space that will be the only experience of its kind in North America." Chevy Humphrey became president and CEO of the private, non-profit museum in January 2021.

Exhibits

The museum has over 2,000 exhibits, displayed in 75 major halls. The museum has several major permanent exhibits. Access to several of the exhibits (including the Coal Mine and U-505) requires the payment of an additional fee.

Entry Hall
The first diesel-powered, streamlined stainless-steel train, the Pioneer Zephyr, is on permanent display in the Great Hall, renamed the Entry Hall in 2008. The train was once displayed outdoors, but it was restored and placed in the former Great Hall during the construction of the museum's underground parking lot.

Lower Level

U-505
 is one of just six German submarines captured by the Allies during World War II, and, since its arrival in 1954, the only one on display in the Western Hemisphere, as well as the only one in the United States. The U-boat was newly restored beginning in 2004 after 50 years of being displayed outdoors, and was then moved indoors as "The New U-505 Experience" on June 5, 2005. Displayed in an underground shed, it remains as a popular exhibit for visitors, as well as a memorial to all the casualties of the Battle of the Atlantic during World War II. Guided tours of the submarine are offered for an additional fee. Near the U-505 there is both a Mold-A-Rama machine and a penny flattening device. Both have U-505 designs.

Henry Crown Space Center
MSI's Henry Crown Space Center includes the Apollo 8 spacecraft, which flew the first mission beyond low earth orbit to the Moon, enabling its crew, Frank Borman, James Lovell and William Anders, to become the first human beings to see the Earth as a whole, as well as becoming the first to view the Moon up close (as well as the first to view its far side). Other exhibits include Scott Carpenter's Mercury-Atlas 7 spacecraft and a lunar module trainer.

Located in the Henry Crown Space Center is a domed theater, considered to be the only domed theater in Chicago. The screen of the theater is made of perforated aluminum, allowing the speakers mounted behind the screen to be heard throughout the theater.

FarmTech
The "FarmTech" exhibit showcases modern agricultural techniques and how farmers use modern technology like GPS systems to improve work on the farm, and includes a tractor and a combine harvester from John Deere. The exhibit also showcases a greenhouse, a mock up of a kitchen showcasing how much of the food we eat comes from soybeans, and how we use cows, from energy to what we drink.

Other
A transportation gallery is located on the museum's west wing, containing models of "Ships Through the Ages" and several historic racing cars.

"Future Energy Chicago" shows alternative resources, housing developments, and the future of Chicago. The exhibit requires an additional fee.

Some areas in the museum aim for younger children, including the "Swiss Jollyball", the world's largest pinball machine built by a British man from Switzerland using nothing but salvaged junk; the "Idea Factory", a toddler water table play area; and the "Circus", featuring animated dioramas of a miniature circus as well as containing a shadow garden and several funhouse mirrors. The Circus exhibit was closed in September 2022.

Silent-film star and stock-market investor Colleen Moore's Fairy Castle "doll's house" is on display.

First Level

Numbers in Nature: A Mirror Maze 
Numbers in Nature: A Mirror Maze contains an interactive theater and stations to learn about patterns in nature, including the Golden Ratio, spirals, fractal branching, and Voronoi patterns.

It also contains a mirror maze to help emphasize the geometric patterns that can be utilized.

Transportation Gallery
The Transportation Zone contains several permanent exhibits.

The Great Train Story is a  HO-scale model railroad and recounts the story of transportation from Chicago to Seattle.

The museum includes a replica of Stephenson's Rocket, which was the first steam locomotive to exceed 25 miles per hour.

The 999 Empire State Express steam locomotive was alleged to be the first vehicle to exceed  in 1893, although no reliable measurement ever took place (and such a speed was likely impossible).  Designed to win the battle of express trains to the World's Columbian Exhibition, it was donated to the museum by the New York Central in 1962.  The locomotive was located outside the museum until 1993, when extensive restoration took place and it was moved indoors as an exhibit in the Transportation Zone.

A replica of the Wright Brothers first airplane, the Wright Flyer, is on display.

Two World War II warplanes are also exhibited. Both were donated by the British government: a German Ju 87 R-2/Trop. Stuka divebomber—one of only two intact Stukas left in the world—and a British Supermarine Spitfire. Also on display is the museum's Travel Air Type R Mystery Ship, nicknamed "Texaco 13", which set many world records in flying.

"Take Flight" features the first Boeing 727 jet plane in commercial service, donated by United Airlines, with one wing removed and holes cut on the fuselage to facilitate visitor access.

Science Storms
In March 2010, the museum opened "Science Storms" in the Allstate Court, as a permanent exhibit. This multilevel exhibit features a  water vapor tornado, tsunami tank, Tesla coil, heliostat system, and a Wimshurst machine built by James Wimshurst in the late 19th century. Also housed are Newton's Cradle, the color spectrum, and Foucault pendulum. All artifacts allow guests to explore the physics and chemistry of the natural world.

Genetics: Decoding Life
In keeping with Rosenwald's vision, many of the exhibits are interactive. "Genetics: Decoding Life," looks at how genetics affect human and animal development as well as containing a chick hatchery composed of an incubator where baby chickens hatch from their eggs and a chick pen for those that have already hatched, as well as housing genetically modified frogs, mice, and drought resistant plants.

The chick hatchery has been part of the museum since 1956. About 20 chicks are hatched a day, around 140 hatch in a week, and up to 8000 hatch in a year. A week after emerging from their shells, the chicks are sent to the Lincoln Park Zoo to be fed to various animals, including lions, crocodiles, snakes, vultures, owls and tigers. This partnership between the museum and the zoo has been operating for decades, with about 7000 chicks being sent to the zoo each year. Some of the chicks hatched are of the Java species of chicken, and these chicks are sent to a farm in La Fox, Illinois that works to preserve the rare breed.  There have been numerous efforts to shut down the exhibit, as early as 1998 and as recent as 2017.

ToyMaker 3000
"ToyMaker 3000", is a working assembly line which lets visitors order a toy top and watch as it is made. The interactive "Fab Lab MSI" is intended as an interactive lab where members can "build anything".

Coal Mine
The "Coal Mine" re-creates a working deep-shaft, bituminous coal mine inside the museum's Central Pavilion, using original equipment from Old Ben #17, circa 1933. It is one of the oldest exhibits at the museum. In this unique exhibit, visitors go underground and ride a mine train to different parts of the mine and learn the basics of its operation. The experience takes around 30 minutes and requires an additional fee.

Yesterday's Main Street
"Yesterday's Main Street" is a mock-up of a Chicago street from the early 20th century, complete with a cobblestone roadway, old-fashioned light fixtures, fire hydrants, and several shops, including the precursors to several Chicago-based businesses. Included are:

Unlike the other shops, Finnigan's Ice Cream Parlor and The Nickelodeon Cinema can be entered and are functional. Finnigan's serves an assortment of ice cream and The Cinema plays short silent films throughout the day.

Other
In spring 2013, the "Art of the Bicycle" exhibit opened, showcasing the history of the bicycle and how modern bikes continue to evolve.

"Reusable City" focuses on recycling and other methods that could cut down harmful pollution and especially climate change and the Regenstein Hall of Science, containing a giant periodic table of the elements. Other main level exhibits include: "Fast Forward", which features some aspects of how technology will change in the future; "Earth Revealed", featuring a "Science on a Sphere" holographic globe; and a "Whispering Gallery".

Second Level

YOU! The Experience
Also well known are the "Body Slices" (two cadavers exhibited in  slices) in the exhibit.

Other
Several US Navy warship models are also on display in the museum, and flight simulators including of the new F-35 Lightning II are featured.

Former exhibits
An F-104 Starfighter on loan to MSI from the US Air Force since 1978 was sent to the Mid-America Air Museum in Liberal, Kansas, in 1993. 

In March 1995, Santa Fe Steam Locomotive 2903 was moved from outside the museum to the Illinois Railway Museum. 

"Telefun Town", a hall dedicated to the wonders of telephone communication, sponsored by the company then known as "The Bell Telephone Company", no longer exists.

Exhibitions
In addition to its three floors of standing exhibits, the museum hosts temporary and traveling exhibitions. Exhibitions last for five months or less and usually require a separate paid admission fee. Exhibitions at MSI have included Titanic: The Exhibition, which was the largest display of relics from the wreck of RMS Titanic; Gunther von Hagens' Body Worlds, a view into the human body through use of plastinated human specimens; Game On, which featured the history and culture of video games; Leonardo da Vinci: Man, Inventor, Genius; CSI: The Experience; Robots Like Us; City of the Future; Star Wars: Where Science Meets Imagination; The Glass Experience; Harry Potter: The Exhibition; Robot Revolution, which was sponsored by Google and featured numerous hands-on demonstrations and advice from experts for prospective future robot scientists and engineers; and four installments of Smart Home: Green + Wired, featuring the work of green architect Michelle Kaufmann. The Science Behind Pixar exhibit opened May 24, 2018. The Wired to Wear exhibit opened on March 21, 2019. The touring exhibit Marvel: Universe of Super Heroes officially opened to the public on March 7, 2021.

Yearly, from late November to early January, the museum hosts its Christmas Around the World and Holidays of Light exhibit, featuring Christmas trees from different cultures from around the world. Started in 1942 with just one tree to honor soldiers fighting in World War Two, the tradition spawned into more than 50 trees.

See also

 Architecture of Chicago
 List of museums and cultural institutions in Chicago

References

Explanatory notes

Citations

Further reading
 Kogan, Herman. A Continuing Marvel: The Story of the Museum of Science and Industry. 1st ed. Garden City, N.Y., Doubleday, 1973.
 Pridmore, Jay. Inventive Genius: The History of the Museum of Science and Industry, Chicago. Chicago, Museum of Science and Industry, 1996.
 Pridmore, Jay. Museum of Science and Industry, Chicago. New York, Harry N. Abrams, 1997.

External links

 Museum website
 Commercials and news clips at The Museum of Classic Chicago Television
 High-resolution 360° Panoramas and Images at Columbia University

Museums in Chicago
Chicago Landmarks
Cultural infrastructure completed in 1893
Hyde Park, Chicago
Industry museums in Illinois
Technology museums in Illinois
World's Columbian Exposition
World's fair architecture in Chicago
Museums established in 1933
1933 establishments in Illinois
Association of Science-Technology Centers member institutions
Science museums in Illinois